Honeywort may refer to following plants:

 Cerinthe spp.
 Cryptotaenia spp.